Conspiracy is a 2001 made-for-television drama film that dramatises the 1942 Wannsee Conference. Using the authentic script taken from the only surviving transcript recorded during the meeting, the film delves into the psychology of Nazi officials involved in the "Final Solution of the Jewish question" during World War II.

The film was written by Loring Mandel and directed by Frank Pierson. Its ensemble cast includes Colin Firth, David Threlfall, Kenneth Branagh as Reinhard Heydrich, and Stanley Tucci as Adolf Eichmann. Branagh won an Emmy Award for Best Actor, and Tucci was awarded a Golden Globe for his supporting role.

Plot
On 20 January 1942, Nazi officials hold a conference at a villa in Wannsee, a wealthy district on the outskirts of Berlin, to determine the method by which they will make Germany's territory free of Jews, including the occupied countries of Poland, Reichskommissariat Ostland, Czechoslovakia and France.

The men establish that there is a significant "Jewish problem". Friedrich Wilhelm Kritzinger, says that the meeting is pointless and that the Jewish question is already settled. Reinhard Heydrich, announces that government's policy will change from emigration to "evacuation", and Fascist Italy will be forced to cooperate. There is consternation over the use of euphemisms from the SS members, who want to adopt an open policy of genocide.

The men discuss sterilisation and of exemptions for mixed-race Jews who have one or more non-Jewish grandparents. Heydrich calls a break in the proceedings, and after praising Stuckart aloud takes him aside to warn him about the consequences of his stubbornness. On reconvening, Heydrich steers the discussion in the direction of wholesale extermination using gas chambers. It is then discovered that the SS have been building extermination camps at Belzec, Sobibor and Treblinka, and making preparations for the "Final Solution" under his nose.

It becomes clear to the attendees that they have been called together not to discuss the problem but to be given orders by the Nazi's. It is described how the method that will be used: the gassing of Jews, and that the permanent gas chambers will be built at locations such as Auschwitz.

Throughout the meeting and over refreshments attendees raise other side issues, reflecting the interests of their respective work areas, including concerns that typhus could break out from the overpopulated ghettos in Poland. A break is called and this time it is Kritzinger's turn to be taken aside and intimidated by Heydrich. Kritzinger realises that any hopes he had of assuring livable conditions for the Jewish population are unrealistic. In return, he tells Heydrich a cautionary tale about a man consumed by hatred of his father, so much so that his life loses its meaning once his father dies. Heydrich later interprets this as a warning that a similar fate awaits them.

Heydrich then recalls and concludes the meeting, he also asks for explicit assent and support from each official, one by one. After giving careful instructions on the secrecy of the minutes and notes of the meeting, they are adjourned and begin to depart.

As the officials depart, a brief account of the fate of each one is given. Most of the members either died during the war or were arrested immediately after; two, Josef Bühler and Karl Eberhard Schongarth, are convicted by Allied military tribunals and executed, and the others acquitted to live a peaceful life in postwar West Germany. Heydrich would be assassinated by Czechoslovak partisans for his brutal rule in Bohemia and Moravia within six months, while Eichmann would flee to Buenos Aires but be captured, tried and sentenced to death by Israel in the 1960s. The film ends with the house tidied up and all records of the meeting destroyed as if it had never happened. The final card before the credits reveals that Luther's copy of the Wannsee minutes, recovered by the US Army in the archives of the German Foreign Office in 1947, was the only record of the conference to survive.

Cast
 Kenneth Branagh as SS-Obergruppenführer Reinhard Heydrich: Chief of the Reich Security Main Office (RSHA) and Deputy Reichsprotektor of Bohemia and Moravia.
 Stanley Tucci as SS-Obersturmbannführer Adolf Eichmann: Head of RSHA IV B4.
 Colin Firth as SS-Brigadeführer Dr Wilhelm Stuckart: State Secretary, Reich Ministry for the Interior.
 Ian McNeice as SS-Oberführer Dr Gerhard Klopfer: State Secretary, Party Chancellery.
 Kevin McNally as Martin Luther: Undersecretary and SS liaison, Foreign Ministry.
 David Threlfall as Ministerialdirektor Friedrich Wilhelm Kritzinger: Deputy Head, Reich Chancellery.
 Ewan Stewart as Dr Georg Leibbrandt: Head of Political Department, Reich Ministry for the Occupied Eastern Territories.
 Brian Pettifer as Gauleiter Dr Alfred Meyer: Deputy Reich Minister, Reich Ministry for the Occupied Eastern Territories.
 Nicholas Woodeson as SS-Gruppenführer Otto Hofmann: Chief of the SS Race and Settlement Main Office.
 Jonathan Coy as SS-Sturmbannführer Erich Neumann: Director, Office of the Four Year Plan.
 Brendan Coyle as SS-Gruppenführer Heinrich Müller: Chief of RSHA Department IV (the Gestapo).
 Ben Daniels as Dr Josef Bühler: State Secretary for the General Government of occupied Poland.
 Barnaby Kay as SS-Sturmbannführer Dr Rudolf Lange: Commander of the Sicherheitsdienst (SD) in Latvia.
 Owen Teale as Dr Roland Freisler: State Secretary, Reich Ministry of Justice.
 Peter Sullivan as SS-Oberführer Dr Karl Eberhard Schöngarth: SD officer assigned to the General Government.

Additional cast members include:
Tom Hiddleston, in one of his first film roles, briefly appears in the beginning and end as a telephone operator.
Ross O'Hennessy, appears in the beginning and middle as the SS Officer in charge of the Building.

Reception

Critical reception
Conspiracy has a 100% approval rating from 7 critic reviews on Rotten Tomatoes.

James Rampton in The Independent praised the film: 

An impressed Austin Film Society had a lengthy review of the film and details about its making.

Awards
 Golden Globe Award for Best Supporting Actor – Series, Miniseries or Television Film (Stanley Tucci)
 Primetime Emmy Award for Outstanding Lead Actor in a Miniseries or a Movie (Kenneth Branagh)
 Primetime Emmy Award for Outstanding Writing for a Miniseries, Movie or a Dramatic Special (Loring Mandel)
 Peabody Award
 Nominated – British Academy Television Award for Best Actor (Kenneth Branagh)
 Nominated – Golden Globe Award for Best Actor – Miniseries or Television Film (Kenneth Branagh)
 Nominated – Golden Globe Award for Best Miniseries or Television Film
 Nominated – Primetime Emmy Award for Outstanding Directing for a Miniseries, Movie or a Dramatic Special (Frank Pierson)
 Nominated – Primetime Emmy Award for Outstanding Supporting Actor in a Miniseries or a Movie (Colin Firth)
 Nominated – Primetime Emmy Award for Outstanding Supporting Actor in a Miniseries or a Movie (Stanley Tucci)
 Nominated – Primetime Emmy Award for Outstanding Television Movie

See also
 List of Holocaust films
 List of conspiracy thriller films

References

External links

 

2001 television films
2001 films
BBC television dramas
2000s war drama films
British war drama films
American war drama films
Holocaust films
Films about Nazi Germany
Films set in Berlin
Peabody Award-winning broadcasts
Films directed by Frank Pierson
Sterilization in fiction
Films set in 1942
American drama television films
2000s English-language films
2000s American films
2000s British films
British drama television films